Mangochi is a township in the Southern Region of Malawi. Located near the southern end of Lake Malawi, in colonial times it used to be called Fort Johnston. As of 2018 it has a population of 53,498.

History
Mangochi was founded by colonial administrator Sir Harry Johnston in the 1890s as a British colonial defence post on the littoral plain of the Shire River's western shore. After this, Fort Johnston – as the town was then known – was an important slave market and administrative centre.

The British gunboat Gwendolen, named after Lady Gwendolen Gascoyne-Cecil, daughter of the 3rd Marquess of Salisbury, was built in Mangochi in 1897. At , it was the largest ship to sail on Lake Malawi until being scrapped shortly after World War II. The gunboat, operated by the Protectorate of Nyasaland, is said to have fought the first naval battle of the First World War when it defeated the German vessel Hermann von Wissmann in August 1914.

Rioting in June 2003 injured three people. From March to November 2007, roughly 480 children were rescued from child labour on tobacco farms in Mangochi. In July 2008, elephants terrorised areas around Maldeco Fisheries in Mangochi and caused several deaths and damage to property, mainly crops. The Ministry of Tourism, Wildlife and Culture proposed moving the elephants into several game reserves, although the proposal stalled when some residents said they wanted the elephants to remain.

Geography

Climate
Mangochi has a tropical savanna climate (Köppen: Aw).

Demographics

Population development

Languages and ethnicities
Yao, specifically of the Mangochi dialect, is the main language spoken in this town. A Swahili settlement was also established in Mangochi. Mangochi is mainly inhabited by the Yao people.

Economy
Mangochi was developed as an agricultural centre and has marine-engineering shops. Cash crops grown in the area include tobacco, cotton, and groundnuts. Rice and maize are intensively grown along the lakeshore, and commercial fishing is also important.

Facilities

Amenities
Amenities include several shops, supermarkets, a post office and banks.

Bridges

Within Mangochi there is the Bakili Muluzi Bridge, which Lonely Planet described as "scenic".

Museums
The Lake Malawi Museum houses ethnic, environmental, and historical exhibits. They include the Hotchkiss gun with which the British gunboat Gwendolen defeated the German gunboat Hermann von Wissmann with a single shot in their brief naval engagement in August 1914. The museum has also a scale model of the Gwendolen. An even older exhibit is a marine steam engine that was built in 1898 and powered the Universities' Mission to Central Africa's SS Chauncy Maples until 1953.

Religion
Mangochi is home to a large mosque as well as a modern Catholic Cathedral.

Clocks
Mangochi is home to a clock tower erected in honour of Queen Victoria, dating back to the early 20th century.

Transport

Mangochi is located just off the M3 road. All buses travelling from Monkey Bay to Blantyre stop in Mangochi. Minibuses travel to Liwonde, Zomba, and Blantyre. Matolas travel to Liwonde National Park and to the border town of Chiponde.

Tourism
Mangochi is described by Lonely Planet as having a "vaguely Swahili feel", with "palm trees, Arab-looking people and coconuts for sale in the street." There are several guesthouses and lodges for tourists in Mangochi.

References 

Populated places in Southern Region, Malawi